The 2018–19 FC Nantes season was the 75th professional season of the club since its creation in 1943, and the club's 15th consecutive season in the top flight of French football. It covers a period from 1 July 2018 to 30 June 2019. They participated in the Ligue 1, the Coupe de France and Coupe de la Ligue.

Players

Out on loan

Competitions

Ligue 1

League table

Results summary

Results by round

Matches

Coupe de la Ligue

Coupe de France

Statistics

Appearances and goals

|-
! colspan=14 style=background:#dcdcdc; text-align:center| Goalkeepers

|-
! colspan=14 style=background:#dcdcdc; text-align:center| Defenders

|-
! colspan=14 style=background:#dcdcdc; text-align:center| Midfielders

|-
! colspan=14 style=background:#dcdcdc; text-align:center| Forwards

|-
! colspan=14 style=background:#dcdcdc; text-align:center| Players transferred out during the season

References

FC Nantes seasons
FC Nantes